Paul Baskerville (born 3 March 1961) is an English radio disc jockey (DJ) on the German radio station Norddeutscher Rundfunk (NDR).

In 2019, he gained international popularity for possibly playing "The Most Mysterious Song on the Internet" on his program in the early 1980s.

Life 
Baskerville was born and grew up in Manchester. As a teenager, he joined the punk band The Limit. He moved to Germany in 1980. Initially, he worked for Karstadt. He started working for NDR in 1981 with features about music from England and especially Manchester. In 1982, he got his first weekly show, Musik für junge Leute which he moderated every Thursday from 13:20 to 14:30. He also moderated the shows "No Wave", "Kopfhörer", and "Offbeat". Over the years, he got different slots. He did also shows for Radio Bremen, Deutschlandfunk and DT64 and reportages for Arte. He also wrote a music column for the weekly paper Freitag ("Friday"). Currently, he is broadcasting the show Nachtclub ("nightclub") which ran from 2003 to 2020 on NDR Info on Saturday from 0:05 to 2:00 and has moved in 2021 to NDR Blue on Thursday at 21:00. One of the most important record stores for his program Musik für junge Leute was the now defunct  based in Hamburg.

Paul Baskerville is married and has a daughter named Emely. He lives in Hamburg.

Baskerville's program Musik für junge Leute ("music for young people") is thought to have been the show from which a German teenager taped an unidentified new wave song between 1982 and 1984 that has become a viral internet phenomenon dubbed "The Most Mysterious Song on the Internet". He suspects that it was a demo recording that was played once by an NDR presenter and then thrown away.

References

External links
 Fansite

1961 births
Living people
DJs from Manchester
English radio DJs
English expatriates in Germany
German radio personalities